Mt. Egypt is the moniker for Travis Graves, an American singer-songwriter from Virginia. In 2002, skateboarding friend Jason Dill connected Graves to the label Record Collection. The following year, Mt. Egypt released his debut album, Battening the Hatches.

In 2006, Mt. Egypt toured his second album, Perspectives (2005), with Band of Horses; he has also toured with The Flaming Lips and Willie Nelson.

III was released in 2009 in a limited print of 100 vinyl LPs, available in California record stores Amoeba Records and Aquarius Records (store), as well as other selected outlets.

Discography
Battening the Hatches (Record Collection, 2003)
Perspectives (Record Collection, 2005)
III (Secret Seven, 2009)

References

External links
Official MySpace

Singer-songwriters from Virginia
Living people
Year of birth missing (living people)
Record Collection artists